Edward McPherson (July 31, 1830 – December 14, 1895) was an American newspaper editor and politician who served two terms in the United States House of Representatives, as well as multiple terms as the Clerk of the House of Representatives. As a director of the Gettysburg Battlefield Memorial Association, he effected efforts to protect and mark portions of the Gettysburg Battlefield.

Early life and career
Edward McPherson was born in Gettysburg, Pennsylvania on July 31, 1830. He studied law and botany at Pennsylvania College, graduating in 1848 as valedictorian.

Career 
In Thaddeus Stevens' firm in Lancaster, McPherson became a Whig. McPherson left the law practice due to illness and moved to Harrisburg, editing the Harrisburg American in 1851, and the Lancaster Independent Whig (1851–1854). In 1855, he started and edited an American Party paper, the Pittsburgh Evening Times. He moved back to Gettysburg the next year and resumed his legal career. He inherited his father's farm west of town along the Chambersburg Turnpike in 1858 and was elected to the 36th and 37th United States Congresses (1859 – March 1863, Republican). He was a member of the Republican National Committee in 1860.

Civil War
McPherson organized Company K of the First Pennsylvania Reserves at the beginning of the American Civil War, and was defeated in the 1862 reelection when his House of Representatives district (Adams, Franklin, Fulton, Bedford, and Juniata counties) was expanded to include opposing Radical Republicans in Somerset County (substituted for Juniata). President Abraham Lincoln appointed McPherson as Deputy Commissioner of Revenue in 1863. After the Battle of Gettysburg, McPherson became an officer of the Gettysburg Battlefield Memorial Association with an office on the corner of Baltimore and Middle streets, and after Congressman Morehead nominated him, Thaddeus Stevens had him appointed as Clerk of the House of Representatives (December 8, 1863 – December 5, 1875).

Postbellum career
McPherson presided over the Republican National Convention in 1876, and President Hayes appointed him as director of the United States Bureau of Engraving and Printing (1877–1878). Returning to the newspaper business, he was editor of the Philadelphia Press from 1877 until 1880. He also served as editor of the New York Tribune Almanac from 1877 to 1895 and was editor and proprietor of a newspaper in Gettysburg from 1880 until 1895. He was the American editor of the Almanach de Gotha. He again served as Clerk of the House of Representatives from December 1881 to December 1883 and for a third time from December 1889 to December 1891. McPherson was the attorney for the 1893 complaint against the Gettysburg Electric Railway which ended in the Supreme Court case of United States v. Gettysburg Electric Railway Co.

Personal life

McPherson married Annie D. Crawford in 1862, and they had four sons and a daughter.

He died of accidental poisoning in Gettysburg on December 14, 1895. He was interred at Evergreen Cemetery in Adams County, Pennsylvania.

The Edward McPherson Society is named in his honor.

Works
In 1941, the papers of Edward McPherson were added to the Library of Congress,  and his published works include:

Popular culture
In the 2012 film Lincoln, McPherson is portrayed by Christopher Evan Welch.

References

External links
 
 

1830 births
1895 deaths
19th-century American newspaper publishers (people)
Clerks of the United States House of Representatives
Pennsylvania lawyers
Pennsylvania Whigs
People from Gettysburg, Pennsylvania
Union (American Civil War) political leaders
United States Department of the Treasury officials
Burials at Evergreen Cemetery (Adams County, Pennsylvania)
Republican Party members of the United States House of Representatives from Pennsylvania
19th-century American journalists
American male journalists
19th-century American male writers
19th-century American politicians
Hayes administration personnel